Live Sky is a live concert album by American rock band Crack the Sky, released on LP in 1978 (see 1978 in music) by Lifesong Records (catalog #JZ 35620). In 1988, four of these recordings were appended to the CD release of Live on WBAB ("Maybe I Can Fool Everybody (Tonight)", "Lighten Up McGraw", "She's a Dancer", "I Am the Walrus"). In 2006, six of these recordings (remixed and remastered) were included on Alive and Kickin' Ass, a live CD compiled from the same 1978 shows as Live Sky. The version of "She's a Dancer" that appears on Live Sky was edited for length; the complete performance appears on Alive and Kickin' Ass.

Track listing

Personnel

The band
Rick Witkowski – Lead guitar
Joe Macre – Bass guitar, harmonies
Jim Griffiths – Lead guitar, harmonies
Joey D'Amico – Drums, harmonies
Vince DePaul – Keyboards
Gary Lee Chappell – Lead vocals

Production
Rob Stevens – Producer ("Maybe I Can Fool Everybody (Tonight)", "Surf City"), engineer
David Hewitt – Engineer
Nick Blagona – Engineer, recording supervisor
Bruce Tergesen – Remixing ("Lighten Up McGraw", "She's a Dancer", "Ice", "I Am the Walrus")
Terry Cashman — Executive producer
Tommy West – Executive producer

Additional credits
Recorded at Tower Theatre, Philadelphia, Pennsylvania and Agora Theatre, Cleveland, Ohio
Susan Reinhardt (AGI) — Design
Bob Heimall (AGI) — Art direction

Crack the Sky was the opening act that night opening for Robert Palmer

Sources
LP and CD liner notes

Crack the Sky live albums
1978 live albums